Clinton Central Junior-Senior High School is a middle school and high school located in Michigantown, Indiana.

See also
 List of high schools in Indiana
 Hoosier Heartland Conference
 Michigantown, Indiana

References

External links
Official Website

Public high schools in Indiana
Buildings and structures in Clinton County, Indiana